The Sacramento blackfish (Orthodon microlepidotus) is a species of freshwater fish in central California. A cyprinid, the blackfish is the sole member of its genus.

Distribution and habitat 
Blackfish are primarily denizens of the warm and cloudy waters found on the floor of the Central Valley, such as sloughs and oxbow lakes connected to the Sacramento and San Joaquin Rivers. They are also common in Clear Lake, Pajaro River, Salinas River, the small creeks that feed into San Francisco Bay. A population is present in the Russian River, believed to have been introduced. They also thrive in reservoirs, and have been spread to a number of California reservoirs via the California Aqueduct, and into Nevada via the Lahontan Reservoir (1964) where they have further colonized the Humboldt River drainage.

Description

Anatomy and morphology 
Blackfish are named for their glossy black color. Younger individuals are more silvery, but darken as they age. The scales are unusually small, counting 90-114 along the lateral line. The forehead has a straight-line profile, the eyes are small, and the terminal mouth slants upwards. The dorsal fin starts just behind the pelvic fins, and has 9-11 rays, while the anal fin has 8-9 rays, and the pelvic fins 10 rays. The pharyngeal teeth are distinctly long, straight, and knife-shaped, not seen in similar species in California; the grinding surface of the blackfish, used to process its food, is relatively narrow.

Adults commonly reach a length of 35 cm, but they have been recorded at up to 55 cm in length.

Behavior and diet 
Unlike most North American cyprinids, Sacramento blackfish filter feed on zooplankton, planktonic algae, and floating detritus, including rotifers, copepods, cladocerans, diatoms, and the like. While younger blackfish pick at food items individually, adults primarily use the oral cavity and gills to filter food from water. The blackfish opens and closes its mouth rapidly to pump large volumes of water, the food bits are caught in a patch of mucus on the roof of the mouth, where it is secreted by the palatal organ, and the food bits are swallowed with the mucus. The size of a blackfish influences its eating behavior; larger blackfish, with subsequently larger oral cavities and easier means of filter feeding, are not seen pursuing individual prey like shorter blackfish.

Life cycle 
Sacramento blackfish usually live no more than five years. Most blackfish quickly grow during their first and second years, maturing at 2–3 years of age. The blackfishes' breeding season occurs from the spring through early summer, where males will fertilize female eggs in shallow waters. Due to physical stresses from reproduction, many blackfish find spawning difficult and die after two seasons, but some can reproduce up to four times.

Taxonomy 
Orthodon microlepidotus, the common name for the Sacramento blackfish, refers to the fish's straight teeth (Orthodon) and its distinctly small scales (microlepidotus). The Orthodon genus is monotypical, making the blackfish the sole member of the genus and a generally unvaried species. Despite its unique characteristics, the blackfish has been recorded reproducing hybrids with the Hitch and Tui Chubs, members of the blackfish's subfamily Leuciscinae also found in California.

Status 
The IUCN labels the Sacramento blackfish as being of "least concern"—though less abundant than previously in California's Central Valley, the blackfish is at low risk of endangerment. Blackfish are known for their adaptations to environmental extremes, especially adapting to fluctuating water temperatures. A study by Joseph J. Cech Jr., a professor at the University of California, Davis, found that the blackfish was able to thrive in hypoxic environments.

Sacramento blackfish are of some commercial significance, and are sold live at many Asian fish markets in California.They are also seen as a potential aquaculture species.

References

Leuciscinae
Endemic fauna of California
Fish of the Western United States
Freshwater fish of the United States
Monotypic fish genera
Natural history of the Central Valley (California)
Humboldt River
Sacramento River
Salinas River (California)
San Joaquin River
Fish described in 1854